Snails are considered edible in many areas such as the Mediterranean region, Africa, or Southeast Asia, while in other cultures, snails are seen as a taboo food. In American English, edible land snails are also called escargot, taken from the French word for 'snail,'  and the production of snails for consumption is called snail farming or heliciculture. Snails as a food date back to ancient times, with numerous cultures worldwide having traditions and practices that attest to their consumption.

The snails are collected after the rains and are put to "purge" (fasting). In the past, the consumption of snails had a marked seasonality, from April to June. However, thanks to snail breeding techniques, today they are available all year round. Heliciculture occurs mainly in Spain, France, and Italy, which are also the countries with the greatest culinary tradition of the snail. Although throughout history the snail has had little value in the kitchen because it is considered "poverty food", in recent times it can be classified as a delicacy thanks to the appreciation given to it by haute cuisine chefs.

Etymology of escargot 
Escargot, comes from the French word for snail. One of the first recorded uses of the French word escargot, meaning dates from 1892. The French word (1549) derives from escaragol (Provençal) and thence escargol (Old French), and is ultimately – via Vulgar Latin coculium and Classical Latin conchylium – from the Ancient Greek konchylion (κογχύλιον), which meant "edible shellfish, oyster". The Online Etymological Dictionary writes, "The form of the word in Provençal and French seem to have been influenced by words related to the scarab."

History 
Researchers have not been able to pinpoint when humans began consuming snails, although archaeological discoveries point to earlier stages than the invention of hunting. A lot of broken snail shells have been found in the Franchthi Cave, in the Greek Argolis, from the year 10,700 BCE. In Historia de gastronomía (2004), Fernández-Armesto points out the possible reasons: snails are easy to handle, and their cultivation "seems like a natural extension of harvesting."  Unlike hunting large game, no guns or dogs are needed, and one's safety is not in jeopardy. Unlike other livestock, snails are easy to feed and can be raised in large numbers:
It is difficult to go beyond the limits of a developmentalist and progressive model of the history of food, according to which it is unthinkable that no food was cultivated in such early times, but snail farming is so simple, requires so little technical effort and is conceptually so close to harvesting methods, that it seems doctrinaire to the point of stubbornness to exclude such a possibility.
– Felipe Fernandez-Armesto.Many sites in the Zagros Mountains of Iraq and the Kermanshah region of western Iran are from the late Pleistocene and include snail shells that have been interpreted as food debris. Specifically, these species were mainly Helix salomonica or Levantina spiriplana. The deposits with snails from the ancient Capsian culture (present-day Tunisia) are of notable importance, as well as those found in the Cantabrian Mountains, the Pyrenees and the northern Adriatic (present-day Croatia and Slovenia), in addition to many other remains of snails throughout the Mediterranean Basin. The most convincing evidence for prehistoric land snail consumption is found in the Maghreb, beginning in the Iberomaurusian (20 000 BP) and continuing through the Capsian to at least 6 000 BP. Outside the Mediterranean region, the occurrence of land snails as food debris is less common. Also, archaeological remains of freshwater snails have been found in Yunnan.

In ancient China, in The Book of Rites, a Confucian text, there is a mention of a snail sauce.

Ancient Rome 
The Romans considered escargots an elite food, as noted in the writings of Pliny the Elder. The Roman breeder Quintus Fulvius Lippinus is considered the "father" of heliciculture, or at least, the first written reference to snail farms. Lippinus established his study center in the Tuscan city of Tarquinia to feasibly domesticate various animals, such as dormouse and wild boar, among many others. However, he was best known for his enormous snails, of which he had several species brought from Illyria to Africa. With a fatty diet he devised to fatten them, he obtained large quantities of snails, which he then marketed in Rome. His snails set the trend among the Roman upper class, and the practice became popular. Lippinus was an innovator who managed a large company that marketed his snails beyond the Mare Nostrum. In De re coquinaria, one of the complete Roman cookbooks, four recipes based on snails are mentioned. Shells of the edible species Cernuella virgata and Otala lactea have been recovered from the Roman-era city Volubilis, in present-day Morocco. They are a harbinger of the escargot found in modern souks of the country.

Modern Age  
Pope Pius V, who was an avid eater of snails, decided that they had to be considered as fish to continue eating them during Lent, exclaiming: Estote pisces in aeternum! ('you will be fish forever!'). In Spain, the custom continued to have continuity as can be seen in the gastronomic literature of that time. Curiously, this book was published in 1614 in Lérida, a city in western Catalonia famous for its culinary tradition of the snail.

Species 
Not all land snails are edible since many are too small–not worthwhile to prepare and cook–and the palatability of the flesh varies among the species. 

From the genus Helix:
 Helix lucorum, European snail
 Helix pomatia, Roman snail or Burgundy escargot, is the most consumed species in France
 Helix salomonica

From the genus Cepaea:
 Cepaea nemoralis, grove snail, known as rayado ('striped' snail) in Spain
 Cepaea hortensis, white-lipped snail

From the genus Otala:
 Otala punctata, known as cabrilla in Spain, are bigger
 Otala lactea, Spanish snail

From the genus Pomacea:
 Pomacea canaliculata, apple snail, although native to South America, is widely consumed in Asia and is considered a highly invasive species.
 Pomacea urceus, in Colombia and Venezuela, where it originates, it is known as guarura.

Others:
 Buccinum undatum, common whelk
 Cantareus apertus (formerly Helix aperta), garden snail
 Cornu aspersum (formerly Helix aspersa), common or garden snail, known as petit-gris in France
 Elona quimperiana, known as escargot de Quimper in France and caracol moteado in the north of Spain
 Lissachatina fulica (formerly Achatina fulica), giant African snail
 Persististrombus latus, known as bilolá in Fang, kolobwidjo in Yoruba and búzio cabra in Cape Verdean Portuguese
 Pachychilus sp. are consumed as food amongst the Maya

Nutrition 

Snail meat has several benefits compared to other meats, highlighting its low calorie and fat content.​ It is a source of protein (between 10 and 19%). Nutritional information can vary depending on the snail species and on who performs the nutritional analysis. Even so, it can be said that snails are rich in inorganic nutrients: on the one hand, 82% water. On the other, minerals such as magnesium and iron (mainly, but also calcium, phosphorus, potassium, and sodium), in addition to a high percentage of niacin (vitamin B3), since for every 100 g of snail meat, up to a 55% of the DRI (in women) and 41% DRI (in men). Consumption of snails is a good source of selenium; Of the recommended daily amount of selenium required, the snail provides up to 50% (in women) and 30% (in men).

Due to its high iron content, the intake of snails is recommended for people suffering from iron-deficiency anemia. Its low-fat content is beneficial because it provides the body with omega-3 fatty acids. In general, regular consumption of snails is beneficial for the treatment of depression , strengthening the nervous and immune systems, preventing heart disease, and regulating the thyroid gland.

Culinary use

Cleaning 
Before using it in the kitchen, the snails must be previously cleaned to remove impurities. The cleaning process (called purgado in Spanish) consists of leaving them alive for several days without eating or only eating flour. The flour method is a homemade resource to clean the animal's digestive tract. Formerly in Spain, the snails were hung from mesh bags from which they could not escape. The snail chef  recommends not giving them anything to eat for at least eight days (although ideally ten or twelve) and then washing them well. Snails that die during the purging process should be disposed of.

Preparation 
The slime should be removed with as many washes of water as possible, with a colander under running water or in a saucepan. Again they are washed, but this time with salt water. The salt also helps cut through the slime. After being cleaned and washed several times, they are transferred to a pot with cold water and salt, and when they come out of their shell, the heat is raised to the maximum, and they are cooked for approximately a quarter of an hour. After this, they are served in the chosen stew, sauce, or recipe. This intermediate action is popularly known as engañar ("cheating") the snail in Spain, since when they notice a certain heat, they come out of their shell, and, once outside, the flame is raised so that they die at that moment.

Consumption 

In bars where snails are offered as a tapa, it is common for it to be served with toothpicks, as this is the typical rustic utensil for eating snails. The ration for a common person ranges between 25 and 30 snails. In haute cuisine-style catering, snails are consumed by grasping the shell with a pince à escargot and extracting the snail with a fork called fourchette à escargot.

On a culinary level, they can be cooked in many ways: stews, baked, a la gormanta, a la brutesque. In the cuisine of Lleida, it is an ingredient in many traditional dishes, in many cases mixing it with other meats: snails with pig's feet, with rabbit, with chicken, with lobsters and prawns, etc.

By region

African Guinea 

In Cameroon, Ghana, Nigeria, and other countries in the area, they are used to eating the African variants of snail, which are larger. Typical of Equatorial Guinea is a giant sea snail called bilolá (Persististrombus latus), which is eaten stewed or sautéed, which in Cape Verde is known as búzio cabra, and it is grilled on skewers.

Mediterranean Basin 
There is a tradition of consuming snails in Andorra, Spain, France, Italy, and Portugal on the European side and Algeria, Morocco, and Tunisia on the African side. Cornu aspersum is the most widespread species in the Mediterranean basin, the Iberian Peninsula, and the French Atlantic coast.

In French cuisine, snails are typically purged, killed, shelled, and cooked (usually with garlic butter, chicken stock or wine), and then placed back into the shells with the butter sauce and additional ingredients, such as garlic, thyme, parsley, or pine nuts. Special tongs for holding the shell and forks for extracting the meat are typically provided. Escargot is served on indented metal trays with places for six or 12 snails.

In Cretan cuisine, the snails are first boiled in white wine with bay leaves, celery, and onion and then coated with flour and fried with rosemary and vinegar.

In Maltese cuisine, snails (Maltese: bebbux) of the petit gris variety are simmered in red wine or ale with mint, basil and marjoram. The snails are cooked and served in their shells.

In Moroccan cuisine, snails also called Ghlal, are a popular street food. They are cooked in a jar filled with hot water, special spices, and herbs. After cooking, Moroccan snails are served in small bowls with broth and consumed hot. Moroccan snails are mostly enjoyed during winter as they are believed to be beneficial for health, especially when dealing with the common cold or rheumatism.

A city known for its snail culture is the town of Lérida, in the north-Spanish region of Catalonia, where the L'Aplec del Caragol festival has been held since 1980, receiving some 300,000 visitors during a weekend in May.

Southeast Asia 
Snails are consumed in Cambodia, the Philippines, Indonesia, Laos, Malaysia, Thailand, and Vietnam. In Indonesia, snails from the rice fields are fried on satay (skewers), a dish known as sate kakul, or grilled, Tondano 's sate kolombi.

In the west of the island of Java, the snails from the rice fields are called tutut and are eaten with different sauces (curry, etc. ).

Other regions 
 Ghonghi is commonly consumed in the Terai region in Nepal
 Northeast India (states of Manipur, Tripura and Nagaland). In Nagaland, snails are prepared with axone and pork meat, especially fats. Locally it is called 'hamok.' In Manipur, they are called 'tharoi' 
 North India (states of Uttar Pradesh and Bihar). In Bihar, especially in Mithila region, they are called 'doka', at other places in Bihar and eastern Uttar Pradesh, they are called 'ainthi.' They are boiled, and the meat is extracted to cook a curry, typically eaten with rice.
 A growing demand in South America, in particular, Argentina, Chile, Peru, and Uruguay.

See also 

 Jellyfish as food
 Snail caviar

Notes

External links

Daily Fiber Food: Escargot Nutritional Value
Allrecipes.com: Escargot Recipes

References

Bibliography 
 
 

Gastropods and humans
Food ingredients
 
Molluscs as food